The 1907–08 Yale Bulldogs men's soccer team was the program's second season of existence and their second playing in the Intercollegiate Soccer Football League (ISFL).

The 1907–08 Yale team along with the Haverford Fords men's soccer program were both declared by the ISFL as co-national champions, making it Yale's first ever men's varsity soccer national championship.

Schedule 

|-
!colspan=6 style=""| Regular season
|-

|-

|}

References 

Yale
1907
1907
Yale Bulldogs men's soccer
Yale Bulldogs men's soccer